Barbara Rossi may refer to:

Barbara Rossi (artist) (born 1940), American artist from Chicago
Barbara Rossi (economist) (born 1971), professor of economics at Pompeu Fabra University
Barbara Rossi (tennis) (born 1961), Italian tennis player

See also 
Barbara De Rossi (born 1960), Italian actress